Ready to Mingle is a British reality television dating show presented by Katherine Ryan. It premiered on ITV2 on 6 September 2021. The show features twelve men competing for one woman's love, but there's a twist: not all of them are single. The men who are in relationships are all pretending otherwise, in the hopes of winning a cash prize. However, it is the woman's job to find out who's taken and who's single with the hopes of sharing the £50,000 prize fund with a single boy.

The show premiered to 120,000 viewers on ITV2. The series finale on 24 September saw the chooser, Sophia, selecting contestant Drew.

References

2020s British reality television series
2021 British television series debuts
Television series by ITV Studios